Siegfried Weiß (18 December 1933 – 13 March 2013) was a German cross-country skier. He competed at the 1956, 1960, 1964 and the 1968 Winter Olympics.

References

External links
 

1933 births
2013 deaths
German male cross-country skiers
Olympic cross-country skiers of the United Team of Germany
Olympic cross-country skiers of West Germany
Cross-country skiers at the 1956 Winter Olympics
Cross-country skiers at the 1960 Winter Olympics
Cross-country skiers at the 1964 Winter Olympics
Cross-country skiers at the 1968 Winter Olympics
People from Furtwangen im Schwarzwald
Sportspeople from Freiburg (region)